The Navy Arctic Service Ribbon is a decoration of the United States Navy which was established in May 1986.  The ribbon is authorized to any member of the U.S. Navy or United States Marine Corps for service above the Arctic Circle. Like the Antarctica Service Medal, it may also be awarded to civilians and members of other U.S. services.

History

The ribbon was made retroactive to January 1982 and is also granted to members of other branches of the military, providing they are serving with a Navy or Marine Corps command when the Arctic duty was performed.  The United States Coast Guard equivalent of the Arctic Service Ribbon is the Coast Guard Arctic Service Medal.

Criteria

Awarded to officers and enlisted personnel for twenty-eight days, consecutive or non-consecutive, above the Arctic Circle after 1 January 1982. For personnel working at remote ice camps or divers working under the ice, each day of duty will count as two days when determining award eligibility. No more than one day of credit can be counted for flights in or out during any 24-hour period. Marine Corps personnel undergoing annual cold weather training above the Arctic Circle do not qualify for 2 for 1 credit. The ribbon is issued for one time service only and there are no devices authorized for additional periods of Arctic service.  The Antarctic equivalent of the Arctic Service Ribbon is the Antarctica Service Medal.  The ribbon is worn after the Sea Service Deployment Ribbon, and before the Navy Reserve Sea Service Ribbon for Navy personnel.  For Marine Corps personnel it is worn before the Navy and Marine Corps Overseas Service Ribbon.

References

See also
Awards and decorations of the United States military

Awards and decorations of the United States Navy
Awards established in 1986
Military ribbons of the United States